The 1993 New Zealand rugby league tour of Great Britain and France was a tour by the New Zealand national rugby league team. The New Zealand national rugby league team lost a series 0-3 against Great Britain but defeated Wales and France in one-off test matches. They also won games against Wigan, St Helens, Widnes, Leeds and the Great Britain under 23's.

Background 
New Zealand last toured Great Britain in 1989.

Earlier in 1993, New Zealand had drawn 14-all with the Kangaroos at Mt Smart Stadium. This was the first ever draw between the two countries. They then lost 8-16 at the Palmerston North Showgrounds before finishing the 1993 Trans-Tasman Test series by going down 4-16 in Brisbane.

The New Zealand squad for those matches was: Morvin Edwards, Sean Hoppe, Jarrod McCracken, Dave Watson, Daryl Halligan, Tea Ropati, Gary Freeman (C), Se'e Solomona, Duane Mann, Brent Todd, Gary Mercer, Quentin Pongia, Tawera Nikau, Tony Kemp, Brendon Tuuta, Jason Donnelly, Stephen Kearney, Gavin Hill and John Lomax while Howie Tamati was the coach and Richard Bolton was the manager. All of this squad, with the exception of Gavin Hill and Tony Kemp, were also selected for the tour of Great Britain and France. However, before the tour, they lost McCracken (surgery) and Brent Todd (injury). The Kiwis would also be without goal kicking fullback Matthew Ridge (knee).

The Frank Endacott-coached Junior Kiwis toured Great Britain at the same time as the senior Kiwis, winning 11 of there 12 matches. Their captain, Henry Paul, was called up from the Junior Kiwis to join the main squad mid-tour.

Squad 
This was the first time that no Auckland-based players were in the squad.

Howie Tamati was the coach and Richard Bolton was the manager.

Fixtures 
The New Zealand side played a total of five test matches while on their European tour and one test in New Zealand before leaving.

Great Britain

Test Venues 
The three Great Britain vs New Zealand tests took place at the following venues.

Wales Test 
The Kiwis opened their tour with what was their first test against Wales since the 1975 Rugby League World Cup. That game, won 25-24 by the Welsh, was also played in Swansea but at the St. Helen's Rugby and Cricket Ground.

A disallowed try in the dying minutes was all that came between Wales pulling off the result of the decade in an exciting clash at Swansea.

Wales led for much of the first half. Two kicked penalties from Jonathan Davies and a drop goal from John Griffiths gave the impetus and on 27 minutes Davies put in a fantastic 40 yard kick to set up the flying Gareth Cordle to score Wales' first try.

However New Zealand were kept in the game by a succession of goals from the classy kicker Daryl Harrigan, and when Quentin Pongia punished a rare weak kick from Davies to set up Mackie just before half-time, the Kiwis took a narrow lead.

Ropati extended the lead to 7 points after the restart before Jiffy's magic took hold on the game again. He kicked a penalty and then repeated the trick of the first half, sending another long kick over the defence to give Cordle his second. Wales smelt victory at 17-16 but almost immediately a lost ball from Devereux allowed Mackie to set up the strong running Sean Hoppe. Both sides exchanged penalties and with a few minutes to go John Devereux took advantage of a hoisted bomb to send Wales into rapture with what they thought was the winning try. Agonisingly for the home side, reserve back Adrian Hadley was correctly ruled offside and Wales' last chance to steal the match was gone.

A famous victory had eluded Wales; nevertheless they had sent a clear message that they were building up to the World Cup and would be willing to take on anybody.

New Zealand: Peter Edwards, Whetu Taewa, Jason Williams, Blair Harding, Jason Donnelly, Mark Nixon (c), Aaron Whittaker, Robert Piva, Denvour Johnston, Jason Lowrie, Simon Angell, David Lomax, Logan Edwards. Res - Gary Freeman, Quentin Pongia, Daryl Halligan, Paul Johnson

Kiwi forward Quentin Pongia was suspended for one game after being sent off for a high tackle.

Wigan: Joe Lydon, Jason Robinson, Dean Bell (c), Gary Connolly, Sam Panapa, Frano Botica, Shaun Edwards, Neil Cowie, Martin Hall, Ian Gildart, Denis Betts, Andy Farrell, Phil Clarke. Res - Paul Stevens, Barrie-Jon Mather, Mick Cassidy, Martin Dermott. Coach - John Dorahy

New Zealand: Daryl Halligan, Sean Hoppe, Iva Ropati, Whetu Taewa, Jason Williams, Gene Ngamu, Gary Freeman (c), John Lomax, Duane Mann, Brent Stuart, Stephen Kearney, Robert Piva, Jason Mackie. Res - Aaron Whittaker, David Lomax, Jason Donnelly, Jason Lowrie

Surprisingly, Kiwi coach Howie Tamati elected to have Gene Ngamu kicking the goals despite the presence of 'superboot' Daryl Halligan at fullback in place of Morvin Edwards who was suffering from the flu. The ploy almost backfired as Ngamu only kicked one goal from five attempts. The match was highlighted by Sean Hoppe's 90 metre intercept try in the second half in which he left both Gary Connolly and Sam Panapa in his wake. Frano Botica, who would represent the Kiwis later in the test series, played against his national squad for Wigan.

1st Test

2nd Test 

Martin Offiah's standing as the fastest player in rugby league took a beating during the second half when after making a break, he was unceremoniously bundled into touch after a 40-metre run by Kevin Iro. Offiah, recalled to the Lions test side after missing the first test at Wembley through injury, had a 3-metre head start on the Kiwi centre.

3rd Test 
Great Britain wrapped up the series 3-0 with a commanding 29-10 win at Headingley in Leeds.

After New Zealand lost the second test, and the series, coach Howie Tamati selected Aaron Whittaker at halfback over the incumbent captain, Gary Freeman. After the match Tamati stated "I didn't believe I could win with Gary, it didn't come off but I believe the decision I made gave us a chance, whereas before we had no chance."

The match was highlighted by an 80-metre try to Lions fullback Jonathan Davies.

France

French Test 
The Kiwis restored some pride by defeating France 36-11 in the test in Carcassonne.

Aftermath 
Frank Endacott was appointed the new New Zealand coach from 1994. The Kiwis were next in Great Britain for the 1995 Rugby League World Cup.

References 

New Zealand national rugby league team tours
Rugby league tours of Great Britain
Rugby league tours of France
Tour of Great Britain and France
New Zealand tour of Great Britain and France
New Zealand tour of Great Britain and France
New Zealand tour of Great Britain and France